This list of 18th-century journals covers published academic journals from a variety of fields, that were current and printed between 1700 and 1799. It also includes journals that, although initially published before 1700, were current and in print during that century as well. Note that a number of personal books and publications were also titled as "journals"; unless notable, these have been excluded.

Formal published subject-related journals by subject

Natural sciences

Philosophy, logic, and mathematics

Literature

Religious and spiritual

Governmental and other public inquiries

Biographical, diarist, and personal journals

Historical incidents

Travel and exploration

General

Other and unsorted journals

See also
 Academic journals
 Lists of academic journals
 List of 18th-century British periodicals
 List of early-modern journals

Literature
Kronick. History of Scientific and Technical Periodicals. — c. 500 journals, categorized with brief descriptions.

References

External links
 Index of journals: Worldcat.org
 Index of journals: Google.com
 onlinebooks at upenn.edu - "United States – Description and travel – Early works to 1800"

Eighteen
18th century-related lists